Flower Mound High School (FMHS) is part of Lewisville Independent School District and is located in Flower Mound, Texas, United States. FMHS was the second high school built in Flower Mound, after Edward S. Marcus High School. With the expansion of the town in the 1980s and 1990s (from 1980 to 2000, it grew from 4,402 to 50,702 residents), a second high school was built to accommodate the growth. Flower Mound High School has been called one of the top ten best public high schools in the Dallas area and consistently receives an "Exemplary" (highest) rating from the Texas Education Agency. The school's fight song is the Michigan Wolverines' fight song, "The Victors".

History
Flower Mound High School was built to relieve pressure from Edward S. Marcus High School and Lewisville High School. Plans were set for a  campus, including two gymnasiums, a cafetorium, an auditorium, a band hall, a football field, tennis courts, and three parking lots. To accommodate additional students, a previously unplanned wing containing 45 additional classrooms was completed in time for the 2000–2001 school year.

108 staff members, led by principal Norman Reuther, taught the first student body of 986 freshman and sophomores. The school was recognized as exemplary in the charter year. In the school's second year, varsity sports were introduced and the student body grew to include grades nine through eleven.

In 2000, Kansas State University threatened legal action against FMHS for an alleged copyright violation on the Jaguar logo. Rather than pay a licensing fee to KSU, as some schools in Texas were then doing, Reuther ordered a re-design of the logo, to avoid the 8% merchandise commission. 

In August 2001, Reuther welcomed the school's first senior class; the student body grew to over 2,400 students. In 2013, the school began a project to build a new campus that would be for 9th graders only. The class of 2018 was the first class to use the new freshman center.

Reuther left FMHS at the end of the 2003 school year. Assistant principal Jack Clark subsequently took over the position of principal. Under his leadership, the school's enrollment continued to grow (see graph, right). In spring 2007, Clark announced his retirement. Paul Moon was selected to head the school.

In January 2008, Moon announced that FMHS would undergo an expansion adding a third gymnasium and a second band room, to be completed in May 2009.

In spring 2008, LISD began random drug testing of all high school students in extracurricular and co-curricular groups; 75 weekly random students from FMHS were tested that spring, and 48 students per week were tested for the 2008–09 school year.

In May 2011, it was announced that Moon would retire and pass the leadership to Sonya Lail.

In 2007, FMHS graduates earned over ten million dollars in scholarships, exceeding $14,000 per person. The 2008 graduating class accumulated approximately $15,500,000 in scholarship money, exceeding an average of $22,000 per graduate.

In 2019, it was announced that Lail would retire and pass the leadership to Chad Russell.

Athletics

Flower Mound High School is a 6A school, competing as part of the University Interscholastic League in District 6-6A, the classification for schools with the largest enrollment. Its main rival is Marcus High School, the school FMHS plays against annually in the Mound Showdown. Other rivals include Lewisville High School and Hebron High School. The main sports the Jaguars compete in are American football, boys' and girls' soccer, boys' and girls' basketball, baseball, cross country, golf, ice hockey (although not school-sponsored), softball, tennis, swimming, track, volleyball, bowling, water polo (also not school-sponsored), and wrestling. In the 2006–2007 school year, every athletic team at the school advanced to playoffs, with several winning the district title.

The 2008 baseball team advanced to the Class 5A Regional Finals in 2008, losing to Southlake Carroll. In spring 2014, the baseball team won the state 5A title.

In 2008 boys' basketball, the Jaguars advanced to the regional quarterfinals, the furthest they had ever advanced, from a last-second shot by Brad Renz, before losing to Colleyville Heritage High School.

In 2008, the school's male swim team placed second at the UIL Class 5A State Swimming and Diving Championships held in Austin, the highest finish ever for any LISD school.
In 2008, the softball team advanced to the Regional Semi-Finals; no team had done this before. They lost to Weatherford HS.

The Flower Mound wrestling team was the UIL state runner-up for two years in a row in 2010 and 2011.

In 2011, the girls' cross country team placed third at state, and in 2015, the boys' team placed third. The boys' team placed second in the state in 2005.

In 2012, the softball team received national exposure when they lost a playoff game on a controversial missed-base rule.

In 2014, the softball team advanced to the Regional Semi-Finals (only the second team to do this in school history). They lost to Lubbock Coronado in the final game of a three-game series.

In February 2015, at a boys' basketball game against Plano East Senior High School, two students (one, a then Flower Mound High School student, the other a former student from an unspecified Lewisville Independent School District school) in the Flower Mound High School student section held up signs reading "White Power". The signs, provided to the students by cheerleaders, were meant to read "Navy, Silver, White" (the school's colors) and "Jaguar Power" (in reference to their mascot). The incident sparked controversy on social networks, and was covered by both local and national media outlets. An investigation was conducted by the Lewisville Independent School District. On February 20, 2015, the Lewisville Independent School District confirmed the display of the signs had been intentional and stated that, in conjunction with the local police department, disciplinary action had been taken.

In 2016, the girls' soccer team won the state 6a title, winning the first state title for any girls' team.

In 2018, the school's cheer team made third place at UCA Nationals in Orlando.

In 2019, the boys’ soccer team won the state 6A title, winning the team's first state title. The score was 1-0 (4-1 PK) against Legacy of Educational Excellence High School. Sophomore goalkeeper Landon Leach received the competition's MVP award.

Academics
Flower Mound High School has been called one of the top ten "best public high schools" in the Dallas area and consistently receives an "Exemplary" (highest) rating from the Texas Education Agency.

Flower Mound has received Gold Performance Acknowledgments from the Texas Education Agency for its attendance (2002–06), AP/IB results (2002–06), college admissions (2003, 2004, 2005 and 2006), and the Recommended High School Program (2003, 2004, 2005, and 2006). In 2005, The Texas Educational Excellence Project ranked FMHS 23rd in the state for Latino Achievement, despite the fact that only 8.2% of the town is Latino or Hispanic (compared to a statewide average of 35.7%).

The FMHS 11th grade team placed first in the nation in WordMasters, an annual critical reading and analysis competition; six FMHS students received accolades for their perfect scores.

Advanced classes
Currently, the only advanced academic classes offered by Flower Mound are Advanced Placement and pre-Advanced Placement courses, but various auxiliary courses are offered to give students further research into disciplines of their choice as "elective" courses. Since the fall of 2015, Flower Mound has offered Gifted and Talented (GT) courses to those who were previously in either GT or LEAP classes.

2,779 students attended FMHS in the 2006–2007 school year, with core subject classes averaging a student to teacher ratio of 25:1. Over half the students of FMHS are in Pre-AP or AP classes; 72% of 2007 graduates went on to a four-year college, and 19% to a two-year college.

In 2007, 36.4% of FMHS students took at least one AP or dual-enrollment course in the 2005–2006 school year; 32.2% of the school population took at least one AP or IB test; that number rose in 2007 to 39.2%. 75% of the 1,162 AP tests taken scored a "passing" 3, 4, or 5, beating the national average of 57.0%. The school currently recognizes 77 AP Scholars, 41 AP Scholars with Honor, 39 AP Scholars with Distinction, and 6 National Scholars.

Off-campus education
Flower Mound High School provides students with several off-campus instruction options. Among the most recent is the LISD eSchool, which provides online courses for high school students needing a more flexible, alternative education. Dale Jackson Career Center offers all high school students in the district a variety of technical and career-oriented courses such as ad design and welding. The Lewisville Learning Center provides accelerated education for grade advancement, alternative education for disciplinary students, and parenting education courses. Lewisville ISD announced plans for the opening of a night school in January 2009 meant to supplement and accelerate existing high school education and provide an alternative path to a high school diploma. Flower Mound students also may enroll in courses at the fairly new Career Center East (CCE).

Standardized testing
Flower Mound has consistently performed well on the College Board's PSAT/NMSQT testing. For the 2016-2017 school year, FMHS had 26 National Merit finalists in the first administration of the redesigned PSAT test, 64 National Merit Commended Scholars, and 12 National Hispanic Scholars. In the past, the class of 2007 contained 13 National Merit semi-finalists, 12 of whom attained finalist status; the class of 2008 had 19 semi-finalists, 17 of whom attained finalist status, 35 Commended Scholars, and 9 Hispanic Scholars; and the class of 2011 contained 34 National Merit semi-finalists.

Based upon 2006–07 scores, the average Flower Mound student scores 1644 on the SAT with writing, compared to a national average of 1511. On the ACT, the average Flower Mound composite score is 22.7, compared to the national average of 21.2.

Extracurricular activities
The school's co-curricular and extracurricular offerings include:

Academic Decathlon
AF JROTC/Aerospace Science
American Chemical Society
American Red Cross
Anime Club
Art Club
Asian Culture Club
ASL Club
ASL Honor Society
Athletic Student Trainers
Basketball
Book Battle Club
Breakfast Buddies
Business Professionals of America
Century Club Award
Chess Club
Cinematic Literature Club
Circle of Friends
Clay Target Team
Computer Science Club
Cubing Club
Dramatic Paws
Dramatic Stage 'Prents
Dramatic Studio 'Prents
ENGin
eSports Club
Fellowship of Christian Athletes
Football
French Club
French National Honor Society
Garden Gnomes
Globally Green
Great Thinkers Society
GSA (Gay-Straight Alliance)
HOSA
I Am Second
Improv Troupe (sPAWtaneity)
International Thespian Society
Junior Classical League
Key Club
Kindness Ambassadors
Learning to Be Tutoring Club
Let's Talk About It
Meaningful Messages
Mens Volleyball Club
Model United Nations
Mtb Club (Mountain Bike)
Mu Alpha Theta (Math Honor Society)
Music Heals
Muslim Student Association
National Art Honor Society
National English Honor Society
National Honor Society
National Science Honor Society
National Spanish Honor Society
Newspaper (The Jagwire)
Photography Club
Poetry Club
Prent Tech
PSAT Team
Rocketry Club
Rosettes
Soccer
Student Council
Students Demand Action
Tech Club (Robotics)
Technical Paws
Technology Student Association (TSA)
Ted Ed Club
Texas Future Music Educators
Tri-M (Music Honor Society)
UIL Team
UNICEF
United Nations Girl Up
Yearbook (The Legend)

Academic Decathlon
Academic Decathlon is offered as a course at FMHS, though enrollment in the course is not a prerequisite for team selection. The FMHS Academic Decathlon team advanced to the state competition for the first time in 2007. Ranked 26th based upon regional scores, the team improved to 10th at the state competition held in Katy, Texas. In January 2008, the team placed third at the Region IX competition and became ranked 12th statewide going into the Texas State finals, where it placed 11. Academic Decathlon also made state in the 2009–2010 competition, finishing 24th. In the 2011-2012 competition, the team went to state and was ranked 13th in Texas.

Band 
The Flower Mound Band is the largest student organization at Flower Mound High school, with 374 members. There are four concert bands that meet during the school day. Each band is team-taught, with multiple directors assisting throughout each rehearsal. There are multiple opportunities for participation in other individual and ensemble performances including All-Region/All-State, Solo & Ensemble, jazz band, musical pit orchestra, as well as a Flower Mound Concerto Competition and Flower Mound Ensemble Competition.

All students in LISD participate in marching band as part of the district curriculum. There are two marching bands at Flower Mound High School: the Competition Band, and the Jaguar Band. The Jaguar Band is a non-varsity marching band designed to help those still developing their musical and marching skills. Students in the Jaguar Band combine with the Competition Band to perform at every football game. Members of the Competition Band are selected through an adjudication process and compete at both local, UIL, and Bands of America events. In 2014, the Competition Band was a Texas State Marching Band and Bands of America Grand Nationals Finalist. In 2015, the Competition Band was named champion of both the BOA Arlington Regional and San Antonio Super Regional. In 2016, the Competition Band was named champion of the BOA Plano Regional, the San Antonio Super Regional, and the UIL State Marching Contest.

Math Club
The Flower Mound High School Math Club participates in several state and national competitions, including the AMC and AIME tests, the Trig-Star competition, UIL Mathematics, UIL Number Sense, UIL Calculator, the Best of Texas competition, TMSCA tests, and the UT Arlington Calculus Bowl.

The Math Club annually sponsors the AMC and AIME tests and invites many of the school's students to participate. In 2006 and 2007, the school achieved the AMC 12 Merit Roll. The Trig-Star competition, a nationally held trigonometry competition sponsored by the Texas Society of Professional Surveyors and the National Society of Professional Surveyors, is also open to the student body and by invitation. In 2007, one student won the state competition and placed fifth nationally, the highest Texas finish in years. Attending the UT Arlington Calculus Bowl for the first time, a five-person team from FMHS captured first place from three-time champion the Oakridge School.

UIL academics
Flower Mound holds claim to two UIL Academic State Championship titles. The first was won in 2001–2002 by Austin Little in 5A Computer Science, and the second was won in 2006–2007 by Christine Barcellona in 5A Literary Criticism. The 2008–2009 and 2009–2010 FMHS Literary Criticism Teams won first place.

With the district realignment for the 2006–07 and 2007–08 school years, Flower Mound won team events at the district level for calculator, current issues, computer science, literary criticism, mathematics, number sense, science and spelling, as well as qualifying in one-act play for the area competition.

Feeder schools
Elementary schools that feed into Flower Mound include: Bluebonnet, Donald, Forest Vista, Garden Ridge, Liberty, Old Settlers, and Wellington.

Middle schools that feed into Flower Mound include: Forestwood Middle School, McKamy Middle School, and Shadow Ridge Middle School.

Notable alumni
 Chris Brown, center for the Phoenix Coyotes (did not graduate)
 James Hanna, tight end for the Dallas Cowboys
 Nick Stephens, free agent quarterback with the NFL
 Lauren Cox, center/power forward for the Indiana Fever
 Trevor Burns, professional soccer player
 Sungeun Lee, South Korean singer-songwriter

See also
 Lewisville Independent School District

References

External links
 Flower Mound High School
 History of FMHS
 FlowerMound.net
FMHS Club list] 

Flower Mound, Texas
Lewisville Independent School District high schools
Educational institutions established in 1999
1999 establishments in Texas